Dame Judi Dench is an English actress. Among her major awards, Dench has won an Academy Award, a Tony, four television BAFTA Awards, six film, and seven Laurence Olivier Awards. She holds the record for most acting majors across all six American and British events, winning eighteen and receiving fifty two nominations. Other significant awards include two Golden Globe Awards, two Screen Actors Guild Awards, and ten critics awards. Overall, in her career to date, she has won 55 competitive awards from 203 nominations. She has also received 10 honorary awards, including the lifetime achievement Special Olivier Award and the BAFTA Fellowship.

Film and television awards

Academy Awards

AACTA Awards

BAFTA Awards

Emmy Awards

Golden Globe Awards

Screen Actors Guild Awards

Theatre awards

Tony Awards

Olivier Awards

Drama Desk Awards

Evening Standard Theatre Awards

Honorary Awards

Critics Awards

Alliance of Women Film Journalists Awards

Boston Society of Film Critics Awards

Chicago Film Critics Association Awards

Critics' Circle Theatre Awards

Critics' Choice Awards

Dallas–Fort Worth Film Critics Association Awards

Dublin Film Critics' Circle Awards

Florida Film Critics Circle Awards

Georgia Film Critics Association Awards

Houston Film Critics Society Awards

Kansas City Film Critics Circle Awards

Las Vegas Film Critics Society Awards

London Film Critics' Circle Awards

Los Angeles Film Critics Association Awards

National Board of Review Awards

National Society of Film Critics Awards

New York Film Critics Circle Awards

Phoenix Film Critics Society Awards

Russian Guild of Film Critics Awards

San Diego Film Critics Society Awards

San Francisco Film Critics Circle Awards

Society of Texas Film Critics Awards

Southeastern Film Critics Association Awards

Notes
K  Shared with Kathy Bates for her role of Libby Holden in Primary Colors

St. Louis Gateway Film Critics Association Awards

Toronto Film Critics Association Award

Utah Film Critics Association Awards

Vancouver Film Critics Circle Awards

Washington D.C. Area Film Critics Association Awards

Women Film Critics Circle Awards

Miscellaneous Awards

Academy of Interactive Arts & Sciences Awards

American Comedy Awards

Australian Academy of Cinema and Television Arts Awards

Awards Circuit Community

British Academy Scotland Awards

British Independent Film Awards

Broadcasting Press Guild Awards

CableACE Awards

Notes
A  Shared with Ian Martin, Al Mitchell, Humphrey Barclay, David Parfitt, Moira Williams, David Jones, and John Guare

Capri, Hollywood International Film Festival Awards

Notes
B  Shared with Michelle Williams, Eddie Redmayne, Julia Ormond, Kenneth Branagh, Emma Watson, Dominic Cooper, Dougray Scott, and Zoë Wanamaker

Dorian Awards

Empire Awards

European Film Awards

Evening Standard Film Awards

Golden Raspberry Awards

Irish Film & Television Academy Awards

National Movie Awards

New York Film Critics Online Awards

Online Film & Television Association Awards

Notes
G  Shared with the respective ensembles of the films

Online Film Critics Society Awards

Palm Springs International Film Festival Awards

Rembrandt Awards

Satellite Awards

Notes
H  Shared with Marion Cotillard, Daniel Day-Lewis, Sophia Loren, Kate Hudson, Nicole Kidman, Fergie, and Penélope Cruz

Saturn Awards

SESC Film Festival Awards

Notes
I  Shared with Robin Wright for her role of Maureen Murphy Quinn in She's So Lovely

ShoWest Awards

Taormina Film Fest Awards

TV Quick Award

Honors, degrees, and titles 

Freedom of the City
 England, 13 July 2002: York. 
 England, 21 June 2011: London.
 England, 22 April 2022: Stratford-upon-Avon.

Commonwealth honours
Dench was appointed Officer of the Order of the British Empire (OBE) in the 1970 Birthday Honours and Dame Commander of the Order of the British Empire (DBE) in the 1988 New Year Honours. She was appointed Member of the Order of the Companions of Honour (CH) in the 2005 Birthday Honours.
 Commonwealth honours

Scholastic honours
 Chancellor, visitor, governor, rector and fellowships

Honorary degrees

Memberships and fellowships

References
General
 
 

Specific

External links

 
 
 

Dench, Judi